Karnataka Lingayat Education Society (KLE Society) was founded by  "Seven Dedicated Teachers or Saptharishis" in 1916 headquartered at Belagavi, KLE Society runs over 250 educational institutions in Karnataka and Maharashtra. On 13 November 1916, KLE Society started an Anglo Vernacular School in Belagavi. Lingaraj College came into existence in June 1933. In 1947, B.V. Bhoomaraddi College of Engineering and Technology was started in Hubballi. Jawaharlal Nehru Medical College at Belagavi and Gudleppa Hallikeri College at Haveri were started in 1963. KLE also runs the KLE engineering college in Belagavi, established in 1979. From 1984 onwards, KLE Society started dental, education, nursing, information technology, computer applications, hotel management, business management, tourism, fashion design, and agriculture colleges, as well as polytechnics across India. Its health care institutions include the super-specialty KLE Society's Prabhakar Kore Hospital and Medical Research Centre at Belagavi. Today under the leadership of Prabhakar Kore, the KLE Society runs 256 institutions.

History
In 1947, the government of Bombay Province made attempts to establish a university in Bombay Karnataka. As per the resolution No. 7914 of Education and Industries Department, the government of Bombay, a committee was constituted on 17 April 1947 to make recommendations regarding form, scope, constitution and jurisdiction of a university for Karnataka. (which meant Bombay Karnataka because Bombay Karnataka was a southern part of Bombay Province). The Karnataka University came into existence in 1949.

Founders
The founder life members of the KLE Society are:
 S.S. Basavanal (7 November 1893 – 22 December 1951)
 B.B. Mamadapur (24 July 1887 – 5 October 1976)
 M.R. Sakhare (1892 - 1951)
 H.F. Kattimani (1 June 1889 – 8 April 1964)
 B.S. Hanchinal (18 March 1891 – 19 August 1979)
 P.R. Chikodi (February 1884 - 8 January 1961)
 V.V. Patil (10 April 1888 – 3 July 1979)

KLE University collaborations and MoU
 University of Illinois, Chicago, USA, 
University of Michigan, USA
University of Missouri, USA
 Sunderland University, UK
Universiti Sains Malaysia (USM), Malaysia,
Copperbelt University at Republic of Zambia
Rhodes University, South Africa, 
Middlesex University, UK
University of Alabama, Birmingham, USA
 Christina Care Health Services, Delaware, USA
Vanderbilt University, Nashville, USA
University of Colorado Denver, Denver, USA
Johns Hopkins Bloomberg School of Public Health, USA
Harvard School of Public Health, Boston, USA
University of California at San Francisco, USA
Fortius World School, London United Kingdom

See also
 Prabhakar Kore

References

External links
 KLE Society website

Education in Belgaum
Educational organisations based in India
 
Educational organizations established in 1916
1916 establishments in British India
Organisations based in Karnataka